Luis Alberto Estaba (born August 13, 1938) is a former boxer from Venezuela, who was born in Macuro, South American point of entry for Cristopher Columbus. He was nicknamed Lumumba, because of his resemblance to Congolese leader Patrice Lumumba.

A late starter into boxing, Estaba became a professional in 1967, at the relatively old (for boxing) age of 29. He beat Pedro Garcia by a knockout in one on February 28 of that year.

He kept his winning streak until losing a ten round decision to Natalio Jimenez in Caracas in 1968. He avenged that loss immediately by beating Jimenez in his next fight, by decision. After two more wins, he had his first fight abroad, when he lost to Jimenez, again by decision, at Santo Domingo.

In 1975, Estaba became boxing's second world champion ever in the Jr. Flyweight division, when he obtained the vacant WBC title by knocking out Rafael Lovera, who was making his professional debut during this world title bout. He knocked Lovera out in round four September 13 of that year. He defended the title 12 times, including victories over former or future world champions Franco Udella, Rafael Pedroza, and Netrnoi Vorasingh. In 1977, he was named Venezuelan Athlete of the Year.

His luck ran out in 1978, when he lost the title to Mexico's Freddie Castillo by a knockout in round 14 on February 19. After beating Ricardo Estupinan by a decision in 15 to win the Central American title in his division, he challenged Vorasingh (who had beaten Castillo) for the world title. Estaba lost by a knockout in five rounds on July 29, in what he knew would be his last fight as a professional, because local Venezuelan boxing laws ban anyone over 40 years old to box professionally, and Estaba turned 40 only two weeks after that fight.

Being forced into retirement, he left the sport of boxing with 41 wins, 9 losses and 2 draws, 27 wins having been by knockout.

See also 

 List of light-flyweight boxing champions

External links 
 

1938 births
Living people
People from Güiria
Venezuelan male boxers
World Boxing Council champions
Light-flyweight boxers
World light-flyweight boxing champions